Sorre is a French surname. Notable people with the surname include:

Bertrand Sorre (born 1965), French politician
Maximilien Sorre (1880–1962), French geographer

Surnames of French origin
French-language surnames